Master is a 2022 American psychological horror thriller film written and directed by Mariama Diallo in her directorial debut. The film stars Regina Hall, Zoe Renee, and Amber Gray.

Master had its world premiere at the Sundance Film Festival on January 21, 2022, and was released in the United States via Prime Video on March 18, 2022.

Plot
Gail Bishop becomes the newly-appointed and first Black master of Ancaster, an elite university in New England. The students at the school believe it is cursed by the ghost of Margaret Millett, who was accused of witchcraft and hanged nearby. Jasmine Moore moves in as a freshman, and is assigned to room 302 along with her white roommate Amelia. Their room was once occupied in 1965 by Louisa Weeks, Ancaster's first Black undergraduate, who committed suicide by hanging in her dorm.

Jasmine initially makes friends with Amelia's rich white friends, although they ask her to clean up spilled drinks and don't pay her back for a pizza she orders. At a party, Amelia's crush kisses Jasmine and Amelia sees them. Amelia whispers to Jasmine that she hates her despite the roommates telling Gail everything is fine between them. Gail's new residence develops a maggot infestation.

Jasmine starts having nightmares and begins to believe that her English professor Liv Beckman is purposely giving her bad grades. She files a dispute, which impacts Liv's application for tenure. Jasmine is attacked by a presence in a black cloak that plants a noose on her door, burns a cross, and causes her to fall out of a window. Amelia eventually drops out. Jasmine tells Gail about the presence, which Gail believes is a racist student. Jasmine is found a few days later dead in her room, hanged.

Esther Bickert, Liv's mother and an Amish woman, informs Gail that Liv was actually born white and named Elizabeth. But after leaving the community Liv changed her name and began to present herself as Black. Esther implies it must have been a possession by the devil to make her do this. When confronted at a faculty party, Liv denies these claims and tells Gail that she was actually the daughter of a Black man, leaving it to the audience to decide what is the truth. Liv eventually leaves, putting on a black cloak that resembles the figure that was terrorizing Jasmine earlier in the film.

Gail criticizes the all-white faculty staff after realizing that she was not truly the school's master, but rather the “maid” who was meant to clean up the school’s diversity problems. Gail notices that history has repeated itself, with no changes to Ancaster's diversity, and she resigns from her position.

Cast 
 Regina Hall as Gail Bishop
 Zoe Renee as Jasmine Moore
 Amber Gray as Liv Beckman
 Talia Ryder as Amelia
 Talia Balsam as Diandra
 Ella Hunt as Cressida
 Noa Fisher as Katie
 Kara Young as Sascha
 Bruce Altman as Brian
 Jennifer Dundas as Julianne
 Joel de la Fuente as Lam

Production 
In November 2019, it was announced Regina Hall had joined the cast of the film with Mariama Diallo directing from a screenplay she wrote, with Amazon Studios distributing. In March 2020, Zoe Renee, Amber Gray, Molly Bernard and Nike Kadri joined the cast.

Principal photography began in March 2020. Production on the film was shut down that same month due to the COVID-19 pandemic. It resumed filming in January 2021 in Poughkeepsie, New York, where Vassar College stood in for the fictional Ancaster College.

Release
The film had its world premiere at the 2022 Sundance Film Festival on January 21, 2022. It also screened at South by Southwest on March 14, 2022. It was released on March 18, 2022.

Reception
 

Richard Brody of The New Yorker wrote that the film was "a passionate and melancholy fantasy that employs supernatural elements for a bracingly realistic view of college life and American institutions." Alissa Wilkinson of Vox wrote: "The movie is so full of ideas that it can be hard to chase down the threads. But Diallo crafts a compelling and smart tale nonetheless, and an engrossing one at that." Ben Travis of Empire magazine gave the film 4/5 stars, writing: "Well-performed, especially by Regina Hall, and directed with real flair and intention by Mariama Diallo, Master transcends its two-dimensional opening to become a complex, character-driven horror with much on its mind." Peter Bradshaw of The Guardian gave the film 3/5 stars, describing it as "a pointed and intensely pessimistic horror-satire on racism and identity politics on the American campus", and added: "It could be that its material isn't fully absorbed into the screenplay, but there is real claustrophobia and unease in each insidious microaggression." Writing for Prime Movies, Albert Nowicki praised the film for being "nihilistic but real" and added: "Its message makes sense, the conclusions are accurate, its horror will turn out to be very personal and comprehensible for many."

Kevin Maher of The Times gave the film 2/5 stars. He noted some similarities to Get Out in Gail's storyline, but wrote: "Gail's story flops about aimlessly while idealistic new student Jasmine... is hounded by genre clichés... and a hooded figure striding spookily across the campus." Ann Hornaday of The Washington Post gave the film 2/4 stars, writing: "Although Diallo makes some trenchant observations about diversity-equity-inclusion initiatives and cultural appropriation, she jams too many plot beats, characters and polemical points into the narrative for all of them to pay off satisfactorily."

References

External links 
 

2022 LGBT-related films
2022 independent films
Amazon Studios films
American LGBT-related films
American horror thriller films
Films set in universities and colleges
Film productions suspended due to the COVID-19 pandemic
LGBT-related thriller films
2022 directorial debut films
Amazon Prime Video original films
2020s English-language films
2020s American films
Films set in New England
African-American films